Gynoxys colanensis is a species of flowering plant in the family Asteraceae. It is found only in Peru.

References

colanensis
Flora of Ecuador
Vulnerable plants
Taxonomy articles created by Polbot